The 2006 Budapest Grand Prix was a women's tennis tournament played on outdoor clay courts in Budapest, Hungary that was part of the Tier IV category of the 2006 WTA Tour. It was the 12th edition of the tournament and was held from 24 July until 30 July 2006. Eighth-seeded Anna Smashnova won the singles title and earned $22,900 first-prize money.

Finals

Singles

 Anna Smashnova defeated  Lourdes Domínguez Lino 6–1, 6–3
 It was Smashnova's 1st singles title of the year and the 12th and last of her career.

Doubles

 Janette Husárová /  Michaëlla Krajicek defeated  Lucie Hradecká /  Renata Voráčová 4–6, 6–4, 6–4

External links
 ITF tournament edition details
 Tournament draws

Colortex Budapest Grand Prix
Budapest Grand Prix
Buda
Buda